This is a list of the Australian moth species of the family Scythrididae. It also acts as an index to the species articles and forms part of the full List of moths of Australia.

Eretmocera chrysias (Meyrick, 1886)
Eretmocera coracopis (Turner, 1926)
Eretmocera cyanauges Turner, 1913
Eretmocera dioctis (Meyrick, 1897)
Scythris adelopa Meyrick, 1897
Scythris celidopa Meyrick, 1921
Scythris ceratocosma Meyrick, 1897
Scythris crypsigramma Meyrick, 1897
Scythris detestata Meyrick, 1922
Scythris diatoma (Turner, 1927)
Scythris erebospila Meyrick, 1897
Scythris fumida Turner, 1923
Scythris hologramma (Lower, 1899)
Scythris leucochyta (Turner, 1947)
Scythris paredra Meyrick, 1897
Scythris pleonectis Meyrick, 1897
Scythris plocanota Meyrick, 1897
Scythris praestructa Meyrick, 1922
Scythris rhabducha Meyrick, 1897
Scythris sporadica Meyrick, 1897
Scythris xenonympha (Lower, 1900)

External links 
Scythrididae at Australian Faunal Directory

Australia